Aranshahik was the first ruling dynasty of Caucasian Albania from an unknown date until the late sixth century AD. According to Movses Khorenatsi, the dyansty of Aranshahik was established by the Armenian king Vagharshak. 

 Prince Arran
 Prince Aray
 Prince Anushavan
 Prince Parat
 Prince Arbag
 Prince Zavan
 Prince Parnas
 Prince Sur
 Prince Havang
 Prince Vashtagh
 Prince Ambakh
 Prince Arnakh
 Prince Shavarsh
 Prince Horay
 Prince Vastamkar
 Prince Harakh
 Prince Hiran
 Prince Anjakh
 Prince Dalagh
 Prince Horai II
 Prince Zarmehr
 Prince Borj
 Prince Arbun
 Prince Bazak
 Prince Khoy
 Prince Yusak
 Prince Khaynakh
 Prince Skaiordu
 Prince Parui
 Prince Pharnavaz
 Prince Pajuj
 Prince Kornak
 Prince Pavus
 Prince Eruand
 Prince Tigran

Cadet branches 
Almost no information exists about Prince Arran and his early successors. According to tradition, in the beginning of the 7th century the Mihranids had invited 60 men of the Aranshahiks to a banquet and had killed them all, with the exception of Zarmihr Aranshahik, who had married a Mihranid princess. Hence the Mihranid family had becomen princes of Gardman and presiding princes of all Caucasian Albania. Sahl Smbatean was a descendant of Zarmihr Aranshahik. According to Arakel Babakhanian Esayi Abu-Muse was a member of the local house of Aranshahik too.

See also 
 Kingdom of Artsakh
 House of Hasan-Jalalayan
 Mihranids

References 

House of Aranshahik